These are the international rankings of Burkina Faso.

International rankings

References

Burkina Faso